Me. Me. Me. (also stylized as me. me. me.) is the only album by the American indie rock band Air Miami, released in 1995. It was recorded after the breakup of Unrest, the former band of guitarist Mark Robinson and bassist Bridget Cross.

Production
Recorded during two weeks in May 1995 at Criteria Studios, in Miami, the album was produced by Guy Fixsen; Gabriel Stout played drums. It was the band's intention to produce an album of short songs. "Afternoon Train" is a re-recording of the final Unrest single.

Critical reception

The Washington Post wrote that Robinson and Cross "trade lead vocals on 13 short songs that combine bubblegum tunefulness ('Neely'), with lounge-ballad melancholy ('Seabird'), evanescent soundscapes ('Reprise') and occasional space-rock bleeps." Trouser Press thought that "the bubblegum aftertaste left by segments of Me. Me. Me. is a bit too strong when Robinson indulges his propensity for creating inconsequential chantalongs like 'World Cup Fever', but he offsets that with reams of bracing, Fire Engines-styled guitar and a guileless new wave sensibility (see 'Dolphin Expressway') that should sway all but the most diehard Anglophobe." The Austin Chronicle deemed the album "a heady mix of danceable trivialities and serious longing." The Tampa Tribune concluded that "Air Miami soars through a universe of pop styles with a surfeit of panache and a minimum of bombast ... Pure pleasure—clean, clever, surprising."

Spin called Robinson "one of the few men in indieland who can hold a vocal melody," and wrote that "the guitar work here is as nimble as Dean Wareham's." The Post and Courier determined that "Robinson's avant pop/punk songs are fun, and serve as great set-ups for Cross' more oblique offerings." The St. Louis Post-Dispatch labeled the album "alternately fun and pretentious, like most 4AD stuff," writing that "faced with the choice of copping either atmospheric Velvets-style arrangements or Wire-esque sprinters, Air Miami did the all-American thing and riffed off both."  

AllMusic wrote that "unsurprisingly, early drum machines provide percussion as well, a sonic signifier that also fits nicely more often than not ... Me, Me, Me is a simpler musical pleasure than most." MusicHound Rock: The Essential Album Guide opined that Me. Me. Me. "doesn't have the giddiness of the Unrest work, but it is sweet to listen to."

Legacy
Time Out considered the album cover to be one of the 40 best of the 1990s. "Seabird" was covered by Maria Somerville for the 2021 4AD compilation Bills & Aches & Blues.

Track listing

References

1995 albums
4AD albums
TeenBeat Records albums